Abuthahir Rizan (born 24 December 1973) is a Sri Lankan former cricketer. He played in 80 first-class and 57 List A matches between 2000/01 and 2009/10. He made his Twenty20 debut on 17 August 2004, for Sri Lanka Air Force Sports Club in the 2004 SLC Twenty20 Tournament.

References

External links
 

1973 births
Living people
Sri Lankan cricketers
Sri Lanka Air Force Sports Club cricketers
Place of birth missing (living people)